Lac-Juillet is an unorganized territory in the Côte-Nord region of Quebec, Canada, part of Caniapiscau Regional County Municipality.

The eponymous Lake Juillet is located in the eastern part of the territory and was named after Blaise Juillet Avignon, a companion of Adam Dollard des Ormeaux, who drowned on April 19, 1660, near Nuns' Island.

Demographics
Population trend:
 Population in 2021: 0
 Population in 2016: 0
 Population in 2011: 26
 Population in 2006: 0
 Population in 2001: 0
 Population in 1996: 0
 Population in 1991: 0

References

Unorganized territories in Côte-Nord